Mateusz Zawistowski (born July 2, 1994), known professionally as Żabson, is a Polish rapper and songwriter.

Life 
Żabson was born on July 2, 1994 in Opoczno, Poland and was raised there. In 2011 he came to Kielce and looked for people who were also interested in rap. He took part in freestyle fights in clubs, where he met the rapper Chaos. Thanks to him he started his music career. He also went to high school in Kielce.

His stage name is the nickname his friends called him when he was younger.

On July 14, 2015, he released his debut mini-album, titled NieKumam. On June 20, 2016, he unveiled his second EP titled Passion Fruits.

On February 23, 2018, he released his debut studio album, titled To ziomal. The release debuted at number 3 on the Polish OLiS sales list. On August 15, he released a follow-up EP titled Trapollo. In 2018, he participated with Pezet, Sitek and Sokół in "Projekt tymczasem" organized by EB, Polish beer brand.

In 2019, he released another album titled Internaziomal. On February 1, 2021, he released the mixtape Ziomalski Mixtape.

He has collaborated with artists such as Borixon, Quebonafide, Białas, Kaz Bałagane, Solar and Sitek, among others.

Żabson is inspired by music from Atlanta and Chicago. Some of his favorite artists are Kanye West, Travis Scott, Young Thug, and A$AP Rocky (who he believes started a new era of hip-hop). He loves simple trap backgrounds. He has a very melodic way of rapping. He doesn't try to convey a message - he prefers to talk about parties, girls and making money.

Dyscography

Studio albums

Collaborative albums

EPs

Mixtapes

References 

Polish musicians
Polish rappers
1994 births
Living people
People from Opoczno